The Federação Gaúcha de Futebol (English: Football Association of Rio Grande do Sul state) was founded by Aurelio Py on May 18, 1918 and manages all the official football tournaments within the state of Rio Grande do Sul, which are the Série A2 and the Copa FGF, and represents the clubs at the Brazilian Football Confederation (CBF).

Current clubs in Brasileirão 
As of 2022 season. Common team names are noted in bold.

References

Gaucha
Football in Rio Grande do Sul
Sports organizations established in 1918